Tenagodes lacteus is a species of sea snail, a marine gastropod mollusk in the family Siliquariidae.

Description

Distribution

References

Siliquariidae